Christian Bogle (born March 6, 2001) is an American race car driver from Covington, Louisiana. He is scheduled to compete for HMD Motorsports in Indy NXT.

Early career

Lower formulae 
Having foregone a career in karting, Bogle made his racing debut in 2018, competing in the F4 United States Championship for Jay Howard's team in the latter half of the campaign. He failed to score any points, taking a best finish of 17th place in New Jersey.

For the 2019 season, the American would perform double duties with the Jay Howard Driver Development outfit, racing in both the F4 US and U.S. F2000 National championships. The latter would see no meaningful results, with a sole top ten finish in Toronto helping Bogle to 17th in the standings, although in the former a pair of wins at the Circuit of the Americas, the first of his single-seater career, put Bogle tenth in the overall table.

Remaining with JHDD, Bogle would embark on another season of U.S. F2000 in 2020. The start to the season yielded a pair of top-ten results, before Bogle was forced to wait until the penultimate round for his next finish inside the top ten. He ended his season 15th in the drivers' standings.

Indy Lights 
The American progressed to the Indy Lights series for 2021, teaming up with Carlin to partner Alex Peroni. Whilst his teammate took a podium in Indianapolis, Bogle remained in the lower half of the top ten for the majority of the season, getting a highest placing of seventh at Detroit, which placed him eleventh overall at the conclusion of the campaign.

HMD Motorsports with Dale Coyne Racing was Bogle's destination for the 2022 Indy Lights season, where he would be joined by Linus Lundqvist and Danial Frost throughout the entirety of the year. Even though Bogle improved his best result compared to the previous year, scoring a fourth place in Detroit, he would remain eleventh in the championship, a mere 277 points behind Lundqvist, who won the title.

For 2023, the American stayed on with HMD for a season in the newly rebranded Indy NXT series.

Sportscar career
2022 saw Bogle taking his first step into sportscar racing, as he joined Team Virage for the final two rounds of the Le Mans Cup. He finished 20th at Spa, before retiring from the race in Portimão.

Bogle teamed up with Indy NXT rookie Nolan Siegel and amateur driver Charles Crews for the Asian Le Mans Series at the start of 2023. Driving for Inter Europol Competition in the LMP2 category, the season opener in Dubai would start out promisingly, with Crews taking pole position, although a comparatively slow stint saw Bogle lose positions during the middle part of the race. Siegel later got the team back up to podium places, before a wheel issue with under half an hour to go forced the team to retire. A turnaround came the following day, as Bogle seemed much more settled within the car, helping the team to take victory on Sunday.

Racing record

Career summary

* Season still in progress.

Motorsports career results

American open–wheel racing results

U.S. F2000 National Championship

Indy Lights

References

External links
  
 

2001 births
Living people
American racing drivers
Racing drivers from Louisiana
Atlantic Championship drivers
U.S. F2000 National Championship drivers
Indy Lights drivers
Formula Regional Americas Championship drivers
Carlin racing drivers
Dale Coyne Racing drivers
Asian Le Mans Series drivers
United States F4 Championship drivers
Le Mans Cup drivers
HMD Motorsports drivers